The March Route of Rochambeau's Army: Palmer Road is a linear historic district encompassing a portion of Connecticut Route 14 (Palmer Road) in eastern Scotland, Connecticut. It was listed on the National Register of Historic Places in 2003 as an evocative surviving element of the march route of the French Army commanded by Rochambeau during the American Revolutionary War in 1781 and 1782.

Description and history
Connecticut Route 14 is a historically major east-west route through central eastern Connecticut, passing through the village Scotland between Canterbury and Windham. At the time of the American Revolutionary War Scotland was still a part of Windham, becoming a separate town in 1857. This road, then in places little more than an unpaved track, was the route taken by French commander Rochambeau's troops in 1781 and again during their return march in 1782 between Providence, Rhode Island and Yorktown, Virginia. French chroniclers of the march described the portion east of Scotland as a narrow, steep, stony road, and their baggage wagons arrived late at their camp in Windham on the westward march in 1781.

The road is now a modern paved two-lane road, but its characteristics are very much as described by the French in 1781, rising steadily and sometimes steeply. Typical New England fieldstone walls line significant portions of the road, another feature commented on by French chroniclers. Views from the road are across hundreds of acres of farmland, lined by stone walls and trees, again very typical of the march period.

To the east about  along Route 14 is another preserved section of the march route, a  stretch along a bypass of Route 14. Multiple other properties whose association with Rochambeau's route is known were also considered for listing on the National Register in a study.

See also
March Route of Rochambeau's army
List of historic sites preserved along Rochambeau's route
National Register of Historic Places listings in Windham County, Connecticut

References

Scotland, Connecticut
Roads on the National Register of Historic Places in Connecticut
Buildings and structures in Windham County, Connecticut
Historic places on the Washington–Rochambeau Revolutionary Route
National Register of Historic Places in Windham County, Connecticut
Connecticut in the American Revolution
American Revolution on the National Register of Historic Places